Siaya County is one of the counties in the former Nyanza Province in the Western part of Kenya. It is bordered by Busia County to the north, Kakamega County and Vihiga County's to the northeast and Kisumu County to the southeast. It shares a water border with Homa Bay County which is located south of Siaya County. The total area of the county is approximately 2,496.1 km2. The county lies between latitude 0° 26' to 0° 18' north and longitude 33° 58' east and 34° 33' west. Siaya has been split up into six new districts. Under the Constitution 2010, the role of districts are still unclear as much of administrative authority is being transferred to the county.
The capital is Siaya, even though the largest town is Bondo.

Demographics

The population in the year 2009 was 842,304.

Government
In the 2007 elections the county, then district, had five constituencies: Alego Constituency, Gem Constituency, Rarieda Constituency, Bondo Constituency and Ugenya Constituency.

As of 2013, the county was made up of six constituencies namely Alego Usonga, Bondo, Gem, Rarieda, Ugenya, and Ugunja.

Elections
At the 2007 parliamentary elections all five seats were won by Orange Democratic Movement.

Governors

Villages and settlements
Francis K. Cherogony first District Commissioner Siaya District February 1967
Oyango, a village in Siaya where Kenyan stage actor Stanley Joseph Ouma was born
 Ujwang'a, a village in siaya sublocation North East ugenya location East Ugenya Ward of Siaya county
 Anyieka
Marenyo, where Ronald Osumba hails from. He is the youngest Deputy President candidate in Kenya and currently the Chairman of the Youth Enterprise Development Fund
Nyayiera, a village in Central Asembo location, Rarieda Constituency, Siaya County
Nyamninia, a village in Yala division of Siaya County
Nyang'oma Kogelo, a village in Karemo Division of Siaya County
Bondo Kolalo, a village in Sihay Division, Ugenya sub county of Siaya County
Karadolo
Sidindi, a village in Ugunja Constituency of Siaya County. 
Sigul, a village in Sihay Division, Ugenya sub county of Siaya County
Nyagondo, a village in Wagai Division, Gem sub county.
Lihanda, a village in East Gem Ward in Siaya County where Mathews Orwa Ong'ondo, The son to The Late Bishop Walter Ong'ondo of Nomiya Church was born
 Naya, a village in South Uyoma ward, Madiany division, Rarieda Sub-county in Siaya county
 Simerro - A village in Rangala Sub Location, Sidindi Ward, Ugunja Sub Sounty in Siaya County 
Nyamila- A village in Nyamila Sub Location, North Alego Location, the birthplace of the late criminal lawyer Silvanus Melea Otieno and the late Reverend Elisha Otieno Wauna
Usenge, a village in Kagilo Sub-Location, Central Gem ward in Siaya County. Kagilo is the birthplace of Dr Joseph Aluoch husband to Lady Justice Joyce Aluoch, a judge at the ICC.
Got Regea, was the first black Kenyan cabinet minister in the Colonial Period was born in 1913- Mr. Appolo Ohanga
Ukalama, a village in Ugunja sub-county, Sigomere division, North Uholo location, Tingare East sub-location. This village is where the first Uholo-north location chief inspector, Mr. Onyango Sylvester Wandayi, grandfather of Opondo Alvin Omondi, was born.
Nyabenge, a village in Abom sublocation, North sakwa location, Maranda Division of Bondo District where the Arch Bishop of New Jerusalem Roho Israel Church Jashon Odhiambo Were was born.
Kagwa, a village
Kanyiner/Kanyinek, a village which houses Ugenya High School and can by accessed from Ligega on the Kisumu-Busia highway
Senior Chief Daudi Olak Owino, former Chief Dentist to President Moi, Dr George Owino

Ethnicity
Majority of the population consist of members of the Luo tribe.

Notable Secondary Schools
St. Mary's School, Yala, a boys boarding school in Gem Constituency.
Maranda High School, a boys National school in Bondo Constituency.
Chianda High School, a boys boarding school in Rarieda Constituency.
Ramba School, a boys boarding school in Rarieda Constituency.
Ambira High School, a boys boarding school in Siaya County
Maliera Boys Secondary School, a boys boarding school located along Busia-Kisumu Road near Kodiaga Market.
Ng'iya Girls High School, a girls National school in Alego Constituency.
Barding Boys High School, Boys boarding school in Siaya county 
Simero Secondary School, A mixed day secondary school located along Busia-Kisumu Road in Simero Village.
Sawagongo High School, near Nyangweso Market along the Kodiaga-Wagai Road.
Lwak Girls' High School, a girls boarding school in Rarieda Constituency
Kapiyo Secondary School, a mixed day secondary school located in West Sakwa, Bondo Constituency.
St Vincent Raliew Secondary School, a mixed day/boarding school in Rarieda Constituency.
Kitambo Mixed Secondary School, a mixed day school in Rarieda Constituency.
St.Christopher Palpal Secondary School mixed Alego Usonga Constituency.
St. Mary Ukwala Secondary School, a boys only boarding school in Ukwala Sub-County, Ugenya Constituency]]

References

External links
Siaya County Website
Siaya District Development Plan 2002 - 2008
http://www.bushdrums.com
Map of Siaya District

 
Counties of Kenya